Ostend Raid may refer to:

Ostend Raid (1798), combined Royal Navy British Army attack to disrupt French invasion preparations
First Ostend Raid (23 April 1918), the first of two attacks by the Royal Navy on the German-held port of Ostend during the First World War
Second Ostend Raid (9 May 1918), the second of two attacks by the Royal Navy on the German-held port of Ostend during the First World War